The Thornapple River Drive Bridge is a road bridge in Cascade Township, Michigan, carrying Thornapple River Drive over the Thornapple River. It was listed on he National Register of Historic Places in 1990.

History
A bridge at this location was first constructed in 1880. This bridge was a covered wooden town lattice structure built by Will Holmes, known as the "Withey Bridge". By the 1920s this bridge was due to be replaced. In 1927 a new bridge was built, using a standardized design developed by the Michigan State Highway Department ten years earlier. The contractor for the bridge was Price Brothers of Lansing. It continues to support vehicle traffic.

Description
The bridge supported with concrete reinforced steel girders and has distinctive camelback arches extending above the roadway. Each arch contains five openings occurring above a line of recessed panels.

References

	
National Register of Historic Places in Kent County, Michigan
Buildings and structures completed in 1927